Paul Scott Levy (born 28 April 1971), also known as General Levy, is an English ragga deejay, regularly employed on studio tracks by drum and bass DJs. He is best known for the track "Incredible" which he recorded with M-Beat. A remixed version of this reached number 8 on the UK Singles Chart in 1994.

Biography
General Levy was born in Central Middlesex Hospital in Park Royal, London on 28 April 1971. He is of Trinidadian descent. Levy's formative years were spent in Harlesden and Wembley in the London Borough of Brent in northwest London. Levy's musical influence was developed in the area, collecting dancehall tapes, beginning in 1981. At the age of 12, General Levy began writing lyrics and went onto form his first sound system two years later with his friends named Third Dimension.

General Levy's first major releases were with the independent record label Fashion Records, who signed a distribution deal with London Records for the re-releases of the tracks he had recorded. He had earlier releases with the record producers Lloydy Crucial and Robbo Ranx (later of BBC 1xtra), but these were mainly tracks that were hits on the underground dancehall scene. General Levy was ostracized by the UK jungle scene in 1994, due to mis-reported comments he made relating to his collaboration with M-Beat on "Incredible". He had claimed in an interview with The Face that "I run jungle at the moment". This controversy has since died down and he is now being cited as one of the 25 UK MCs "who changed the game".

"Incredible" was featured in the film Ali G Indahouse, and as a TV advertising campaign by Honda.

General Levy briefly collaborated with Rocco Barker of Flesh for Lulu in the band The Space Police. Levy also featured on the song "Only God Can Judge Me" by R&B singer Mark Morrison.

He collaborated with Madness singer Suggs on his 1998 album The Three Pyramids Club, on the track "Girl".

Levy featured on many sound systems in the late 1980s and early 1990s, such as Java One love and Tippertone Sound.

His collaborations with dub producer Joe Ariwa appear on several releases including "In the Ghetto" and "Be Conscious & Wise: Dub Showcase".

In 2018, he collaborated with artists such as Chase & Status, Fedde Le Grand and Spragga Benz.

Discography

Albums
Double Trouble (1991, Gussie P Records) – Capleton & General Levy
The Wickeder General (1992, Fashion Records)
Wickedness Increase (1993, FFRR/London)
Rumble in the Jungle Volume One (1994, Jungle Fashion Records) – Top Cat & General Levy
New Breed (1999, Arts Records)
Spirit & Faith (2008, BoombamMuzik)
We Progressive (feat The PSB Family) (2011, X-Ray Records)
In the Chamber of Dub (2012, Ariwa Sounds) – Joe Ariwa & General Levy
4ward (2014) – DJ Bonnot & General Levy
Be Conscious and Wise – General Levy & Joe Ariwa

Singles

Book
On 13 November 2022 Levy self published his autobiography entitled Incredible exoloring his life and career to date.

References

External links

Official website

1971 births
Living people
People from Park Royal
English reggae musicians
English drum and bass musicians
Black British male rappers
Ragga musicians
Musicians from London
English people of Trinidad and Tobago descent